The Austrian national women's ice hockey team represents Austria at the International Ice Hockey Federation's IIHF World Women's Championships and is controlled by . Austria has 644 female players in 2011.

Tournament record

Olympic Games

The women's team of Austria has never qualified for an Olympic tournament.

World Championship
The Austrian team participated in the World championship for the first time in 2004 (in Division III). That same year, Austria was promoted to Division II. They remained there until their promotion to Division I further to the world championship 2008. Their best performance was 10th place at the World championship of 2015

Team

2022 roster
Roster for the 2022 IIHF Women's World Championship Division I Group A. Player age at beginning of tournament, 24 April 2022.

Head coach: Jari RiskuAssistant coaches: Florian Hajek, Pekka Hämäläinen

Awards and honors
Charlotte Wittich, Directorate Award, Best Defender, 2019 IIHF Women's World Championship Division I

References

External links

IIHF profile
National Teams of Ice Hockey

Women's national ice hockey teams in Europe
Women's national sports teams of Austria
2001 establishments in Austria